The Borrowed Babies is a 1914 Austro-Hungarian film directed by Michael Curtiz.

Plot summary

Cast 
 Aladár Ihász as Aladár
 Lili Berky as Emma, Aladár felesége (as Berki Lili)
 Kató Berky as Aranka, Emma húga
 Alajos Mészáros as Dezsõ, Aranka férje
 Elza Báthory as Az anya
 Marcsa Simon as A mosónõ (as Mariska Simon)
 Hugó Kozma as A pincér
 József Berky as Detektív
 Mátyás Némedy as A rendõr
 Bertalan Pálfy as A fiákeres
 Gyula Nagy as Kálmán, Aladár fõnöke

References

External links
 

1914 films
Austrian black-and-white films
Hungarian black-and-white films
Films directed by Michael Curtiz
Austrian silent feature films
Hungarian silent feature films
Austro-Hungarian films